The 2018 European Golf Team Championships men's team event was an event forming part of the 2018 European Golf Team Championships tournament being played in August 2018 at Gleneagles, Scotland. 16 two-player teams took part in the competition.

The event was part of the 2018 European Championships, the inaugural edition of the European Championships, a multi-sport event which is to take place in Berlin, Germany, and Glasgow, Scotland from 2 to 12 August 2018. Sweden 3 took the title from the France 2 team on a second play-off hole - in effect the 20th hole, having finished all square after 18. The Great Britain 3 team won bronze.

Format
The European Golf Team Championships are taking place at Gleneagles in Scotland from 8−12 August 2018, featuring a 50/50 gender split in the field with male and female professionals competing for equal prize money in a men's team match play championship, a women's team match play championship, and a mixed team 18-hole foursomes stroke play championship.

The women's  team championships featured a round-robin group fourball format, on 8–10 August, with the winners of each of the four groups progressing to the semi-finals where foursomes will determine the winners, on 12 August. In the group stage, two points were awarded for a win, one point for a halved match, and no points for a loss. Ties between two teams in the standings were determined by their head-to-head result and if teams were still tied for first place then a sudden-death playoff would occur.

Qualification
Qualification for the Championships was via the European Golf Team Championships points tables based on Women's World Golf Rankings points earned from tournaments finishing between 10 July 2017 and 9 July 2018 with a maximum of three teams representing any one nation in each event.

Competitors

Results

Pool play
Teams were divided into 4 groups of 4 teams and played round-robin matches Wednesday to Friday using the fourball format.
Round 1 – 8 August
Round 2 – 9 August
Round 3 – 10 August

Medal bracket
Sunday, 12 August

References

2018 European Golf Team Championships